Henriqueta Lisboa (1901–1985) was a Brazilian writer. She was awarded the Prêmio Machado de Assis for her lifetime achievement by the Brazilian Academy of Letters. She is famous for her well-chosen words to create powerful poems. Her early lyrics deal with traditional poetic themes, while her later poems like Echo, she mysteriously magnifies the effect of a single image.

Several of her poems were translated into other languages: English, French, Spanish, Latin and German. Some of them below:

The echo– translated by Blanca Lobo Filho
Ein Dichter war im Krieg– translated by Blanca Lobo Filho
Palmier des plages– translated by Véra Conradt

Bibliography 

 Fogo fátuo, poetry, 1925
 Enternecimento, poetry, 1929
 Velório, poetry, 1936
 Prisioneira da noite, poetry, 1941
 O menino poeta, poetry, 1943 (first edition)
 O menino poeta, poetry, 1975 (special edition)
 O menino poeta, poetry, 1984
 A face lívida, poetry, 1945
 Flor da morte, poetry, 1949
 Almas femininas da América do Sul, essay, 1928
 Alphonsus de Guimaraens, essay, 1945
 A poesia de Ungaretti, essay, 1957
 A poesia de "Grande sertão: veredas", essay, 1958
 Reflexões sobre a história: discurso, essay, 1959
 Antologia poética para an infância e a juventude, compilation, 1961
 Antologia poética para an infância e a juventude, compilation, 1966
 Literatura oral para an infância e a juventude. Lendas, contos e fábulas populares no Brasil, compilation, 1968
 Contos de Dante, translation, 1969
 Poemas escolhidos de Gabriela Mistral, translation, 1969
 Henriqueta Lisboa: poesia traduzida, translation, 2001

References

1901 births
1985 deaths
Brazilian women poets
20th-century Brazilian poets
20th-century Brazilian women writers